The men's tournament of the 2017 M&M Meat Shops Canadian Junior Curling Championships was held from January 21 to 29 at the Archie Browning Sports Centre and the Esquimalt Curling Club.

Teams
The teams are listed as follows:

Round-robin standings

Round-robin results
All draw times are listed in Eastern Standard Time (UTC−5:00).

Pool A

Draw 1

Draw 2

Draw 3

Draw 4

Draw 5

Draw 6

Draw 7

Draw 9

Draw 10

Pool B

Draw 1

Draw 2

Draw 3

Draw 4

Draw 5

Draw 6

Draw 7

Draw 8

Draw 9

Draw 10

Placement Round

Seeding Pool

Standings

Draw 12

Draw 13

Draw 14

Draw 15

Draw 16

Draw 17

Championship Pool

Championship Pool Standings
After Round-robin standings

Draw 12

Draw 13

Draw 14

Draw 15

Draw 16

Draw 17

Tiebreaker

Playoffs

Semifinal

Final

References

External links

Junior Championships
Canadian Junior Curling Championships, 2017
Sports competitions in Victoria, British Columbia
Canadian Junior Curling Championships
Canadian Junior Curling